Lamiyan (also Romanized as Lamīyan, Lāmeyān, and Lāmīān; also known as Lāmanjān) is a village in Miyan Rud Rural District, Qolqol Rud District, Tuyserkan County, Hamadan Province, Iran. At the 2006 census, its population was 2,321, in 539 families.

References 

Populated places in Tuyserkan County